The Home-Made Car (1963) is a short, silent film directed by James Hill about a young man who rebuilds a vintage car and finds love. The film was nominated for an Academy Award (Short Subjects, Live Action Subjects), and won a Silver Bear (Short Film) at the Berlin International Film Festival.

Plot

A young man sets to work restoring a vintage car at the home of his aunt. The little girl who lives next door is intent on sabotaging his project at any cost, but when he wins her over with a smile, she ends up helping him to build it.
He completes the project and wins the hand of the girl’s older sister, who has been dating a mannerless local who tears around in a sports car.

Locations

The film was shot largely in and around Farnborough, Hampshire, and Cove, Hampshire. The car was rebuilt at Blackwell Cottage, Cambridge Road West, Farnborough. The house remains, although the garage has been replaced by a detached house, now number 26.  The house where the little girl lived, next door, is also still there. As well as Farnborough, parts of the filming took place at the petrol station in Bucks Horn Oak, Hampshire and Seale, Surrey.

Cult success

The film became a cult success when regularly broadcast as a trade test colour transmission on the run up to the start of BBC2 colour transmissions. Originally screened from September 1968 until August 1973, it was one of a series of short films broadcast to help television engineers set up new colour television sets. Other popular offerings were The North Sea Quest, Overhaul, Crown of Glass, Roads to Roam, The Small Propeller, The Cattle Carters, Prospect for Plastics, A Journey into the Weald of Kent, Giuseppina  and Evoluon.

The Home Made Car has been made available by the BFI as an extra on either DVD or Blu-ray discs along with two more short films from the sixties also directed by James Hill called Giuseppina and Skyhook and included with the main movie called 'Lunch Hour'.

The car

The owner of the Bullnose Morris in the film, Eric Longworth, kept the car until his death in 2011. The car is now owned by Stuart Cooke of Darwen Lancashire.
When the film was shot, the car had already been fully restored, so the chassis of another car which Eric was restoring at the time, a rare 1916 Perry, was used to replicate the Morris during restoration.

The featured sports car, registration VWK 929, is a white late '50s Austin-Healey 100-6 with red interior.

BP production

Production of the film was sponsored by the British Petroleum company (BP), and the Bucks Horn Oak scenes were based at a petrol filling station. BP continues to distribute the film.

Music

The music was by Ron Grainer and it includes a pastiche of the theme from Steptoe and Son when an old rag and bone man tries to steal the front wings and radiator shell from the still incomplete car.

Cast

Ronald Chudley (b. 1937) - Young man
Sandra Leo (b. 1955) - Little girl 
Frank Sieman (1908 - 1992) - Garage owner
Caroline Mortimer (1942 - 2020) stepdaughter of Sir John Mortimer) - Young woman
Anthony James (1942 - 2020) Sports car driver
Alice Bowes (1889 - 1969) - Auntie

References

External links
 
 Watch The Home Made Car at BP Video Library

British independent films
British short films
Films set in Hampshire
1963 films
Films about automobiles
Films directed by James Hill (British director)
Conservation and restoration of vehicles
Films scored by Ron Grainer
1960s British films